The Imam Hasan al-Askari Mosque dates from the Abbasid Caliphate and is located in Qom.

References

External links

Mosques in Iran
Mosque buildings with domes
National works of Iran
Buildings and structures in Qom